is a Japanese animation studio based in Sendagaya, Shibuya, Tokyo. The studio was founded on August 8, 2005, and has produced anime works including Aggretsuko, Ore, Tsushima, Dinosaur Biyori and Please Take My Brother Away!.

Works

Television series

Anime films

OVAs/Specials

ONAs

References

External links 

 Official website 
 

 
Animation studios in Tokyo
Japanese animation studios
Japanese companies established in 2005
Mass media companies established in 2005